Kong Jie (born 25 November 1982) is a Chinese professional Go player.

Biography 
Kong Jie turned professional in 1994 at the age of 12. He was promoted to 7-dan after eight years in 2001. In 2004 he was sent into the Teda Cup as China's representative against Lee Chang-ho and Yoda Norimoto. Kong Jie is China's 29th professional 9-dan, doing so by being runner-up in the 13th Samsung Cup, and entering the finals of the Asian TV Cup for the first time. In 2009, Kong Jie achieved a major international breakthrough by winning the Asian TV Cup—defeating Korea's top three players of Lee Sedol, Lee Chang-ho and Kang Dongyun respectively. His win marked the end of several years of poor personal international results. Later in the year, Kong Jie followed up by reaching the semi-finals of the 14th Samsung Cup and won the title by defeating his two compatriots Gu Li and Qiu Jun.

In 2010, Kong Jie passed the preliminary rounds of the 14th LG Cup to face former champion Lee Chang-ho in the finals. Kong won the match 2–0 and also the tournament. Later in the year, Kong Jie successfully defended his Asian TV Cup, defeating Korea's Lee Chang-ho and Japan's Yuki Satoshi. He followed that with another big win over a red hot Lee Sedol, to win the 23rd Fujitsu Cup. He arguably cemented his status as the 2010 world's strongest Go player. In 2011, Kong overcame compatriot Meng Tailing to again reach the LG Cup Final, but was unable to defend his title against another compatriot, Piao Wenyao, thus allowing the latter to win his first world title and be promoted to 9-dan professional on the merit of winning a world championship.

This was the last international final Kong played in. Within the next few years, with the rise of new 1990s generation professionals and the increased competition at the international level, only Gu Li and Lee Sedol would continue to have high tournament placings in big international tournaments. During the 15th Samsung Cup, Kong defeated a soon to be wedded Lee Chang-Ho before succumbing to Kim Ji-Seok in the quarterfinals. The match, with Kong playing Black, turned out to be a crucial "fight to the death" of both sides' dragons, but Kong miscalculated a combination by Kim on move 150, and on move 202, resigned, thus failing to defend his crown.

Style 
Kong Jie is considered to be an expert at life and death problems. In China he is known as the King of Tsumego (King Kong).

Promotion record

Career record

Titles and runners-up 

Ranks #7 in total number of titles in China and tied for #6 in total international titles.

Head-to-head record vs selected players
 

Players who have won international go titles in bold.

 Gu Li 18:26
 Hu Yaoyu 24:13
 Liu Xing 13:13
 Chang Hao 11:15
 Qiu Jun 21:4
 Lee Sedol 7:18
 Zhou Ruiyang 12:11
 Wang Xi 13:9
 Li Zhe 12:9
 Zhou Heyang 12:9
 Peng Quan 12:8
 Xie He 10:9
 Jiang Weijie 9:9
 Wang Lei 10:7
 Lee Changho 8:8
 Ding Wei 10:5
 Niu Yutian 10:5
 Wang Yao 8:7
 Yu Bin 8:7
 Piao Wenyao 6:9
 Liu Shizhen 4:10
 Wang Yuhui 10:3
 Chen Yaoye 6:6
 Choi Cheolhan 5:7

References

External links
 Interview

1982 births
Living people
Go players from Shanghai
Asian Games medalists in go
Go players at the 2010 Asian Games
Asian Games silver medalists for China
Medalists at the 2010 Asian Games